Pauling is a surname. People, places, and organizations with it include:

Linus Pauling
Paulingite 
Pauling's rules
4674 Pauling
Linus Pauling Institute
Linus Pauling Library
Linus Pauling Award
Pauling Field
Ava Helen Pauling, wife of Linus
Tom Pauling

See also
Paulingite
Pawling (disambiguation)